William Bulmer may refer to:

Sir William Bulmer (businessman) (1920–2012), English businessman
Sir William Bulmer (politician) (by 1465–1531), English knight and MP
William Bulmer (printer) (1757–1830), English printer

See also
Billy Bulmer (Sir James William Bulmer), English public servant and rugby league player